'List of documentary films and TV specials about the War in Afghanistan (2001–2021).
 Afghan Massacre: The Convoy of Death (documentary film, 2002)
 The Chicken Commander (Icelandic documentary film, 2004)
 Enemies of Happiness (documentary film, 2006)
 Commando: On the Front Line (British ITV TV series, 9 episodes, 2007)
 Taking on the Taliban (BBC Panorama TV episode, 05-11-2007)
 Taxi to the Dark Side (documentary film, 2007)
 Above and Beyond (TV special, 2008)
 Afghanistan: The Forgotten War (PBS Now TV episode, 17-07-2008)
 Three Bloody Summers (BBC Panorama TV episode, 03-11-2008)
 Jack: A Soldier's Story (BBC Panorama TV episode, 07-11-2008)
 Battle Scarred (TV special, 2009)
 Obama's War (PBS Frontline TV episode, 2009)
 Rethink Afghanistan (documentary film, 2009)
 Armadillo (film, 2010)
 The Battle for Marjah (HBO documentary film, 2010)
 Afghanistan - Behind Enemy Lines (British Channel 4 TV episode, 01-02-2010)
 Camp Victory, Afghanistan (documentary film, 2010)
 Guardian Angels (Australian SBS Dateline TV episode, 26-09-2010)
 Hell and Back Again (documentary film, 2010)
 Restrepo (documentary film, 2010)
 Sisters in Arms (Canadian documentary film, 2010)
 Battle for Bomb Alley (TV special, 2011)
 Afghanistan (Finnish TV series, 8 episodes, 2011)
 Bomb Patrol Afghanistan (U.S. G4 TV series, 17 episodes, 2011–2012)
 Endgame Afghanistan (British ITV Tonight TV episode, 17-02-2011)
 Hooligans At War (documentary, 2011)
 Norway At War: Mission Afghanistan (TV series, 6 episodes 2011)
 War for Peace (Swedish TV series, 6 episodes, 2011)
 Our War: 10 Years in Afghanistan (BBC TV series, 6 episodes, 2011–2012)
 Afghanistan: The Great Game – A Personal View by Rory Stewart  (2 episodes, 2012)
 Afghanistan: The Surge (PBS documentary film, 2012) https://www.youtube.com/watch?v=ZvZj3u1Eenw&t=5821s
 Lifesavers in Afghanistan (Norwegian TV series, 2 episodes, Livredderne i Afghanistan) 2012
 Royal Marines: Mission Afghanistan (British Channel 5 TV series, 6 episodes, 2012)
 Inside Combat Rescue (NGC TV series, 6 episodes, 2013)
 Mission Afghanistan (documentary film, 2013)
 Battleground Afghanistan (NGC TV series, 5 episodes, 2013) EyeWitness War (NGC TV series, 17 episodes, 2013) This Is What Winning Looks Like (documentary film, 2013)
 The Kill Team (documentary film, 2013)
 Commando: Return to the Front Line (documentary film, 2014)
 The Hornet's Nest (documentary film, 2014)
 Korengal (documentary film, 2014)
 Bitter Lake (documentary film, 2015)
 Apache Warrior (Netflix documentary film, 2017)
 Legion of Brothers (documentary film, 2017) 
 Medal of Honor (Netflix TV series, 2018)
 Combat Obscura'' (documentary film, 2018)
 The Outpost (film, based on events at Combat Outpost Keating, 2019)
 Retrograde (documentary film, 2022)

References

External links
 List with summaries and links to some videos

 
Afghanistan War (2001-present) documentaries
Lists of documentaries